Stand-Up Spotlight was a VH1 stand-up comedy television series.

References

External links

American television series